Diamondhead is an album by American saxophonist David "Fathead" Newman which was recorded in 2007 and released on the HighNote label early the following year.

Reception

In his review on AllMusic, Thom Jurek states "It is a solid jazz date with some wonderful post-hard bop and soul-jazz touches here. ... This is a stellar little quintet date and offers living proof that Walton, Fuller, and Newman show no signs of slowing down". On All About Jazz, Douglas Payne noted "David "Fathead" Newman has had a remarkably consistent recording career over the last half century (and markedly prolific since signing onto HighNote) and Diamondhead is one of the purest of pleasures in his capacious catalog" while Martin Longley was less entusiastic writing "The Diamondhead isn't really attempting any innovation, so he can hardly be dismissed for this album's lack of surprises. On the level of a relaxed, inviting glide, it's a very organic, warm-hearted set"

Track listing 
All compositions by David Newman except where noted.
 "Diamondhead" – 7:40
 "Can't We Be Friends?" (Paul James, Kay Swift) – 5:24
 "New York State of Mind" (Billy Joel) – 4:27
 "Cedar's Blues" (Cedar Walton) – 5:35
 "My Full House" – 5:40
 "Skylark" (Hoagy Carmichael, Johnny Mercer) – 7:27
 "Star Eyes" (Gene de Paul, Don Raye) – 7:36
 "Mama-Lou" – 5:17
 "It's You or No One" (Jule Styne Sammy Cahn) – 6:19

Personnel 
David "Fathead" Newman – tenor saxophone, alto saxophone, flute
Curtis Fuller – trombone
Cedar Walton – piano
Peter Washington – bass
Yoron Israel – drums

References 

David "Fathead" Newman albums
2008 albums
HighNote Records albums